Maximiliano Andres Bustos (born 5 January 1982 in San Luis) is an Argentine football midfielder currently playing for San Martín de San Juan.

Career

Bustos made his professional debut in 2000 for Velez Sarsfield. In 2005, he was part of the squad that won the Clausura 2005 tournament. He made over 150 league appearances dor the club.

In 2008, he joined Banfield where he was part of the squad that won the Argentine championship for the first time in the history of the club, clinching the Apertura 2009 championship on the final day of the season.

Honours
Vélez Sarsfield
Primera División Argentina: Clausura 2005
Banfield
Primera División Argentina: Apertura 2009

External links
 Argentine Primera statistics at Futbol XXI  
 Football-Lineups player profile

1982 births
Living people
People from San Luis, Argentina
Argentine footballers
Association football midfielders
Argentine Primera División players
Club Atlético Vélez Sarsfield footballers
Club Atlético Banfield footballers